Tobias Salmelainen (born March 27, 1985) is a Finnish former ice hockey player.

Salmelainen made his SM-liiga debut playing with HIFK during the 2005–06 SM-liiga season. His last season was with Espoo Blues during the 2012–13 SM-liiga season.

References

External links

1985 births
Living people
Finnish ice hockey left wingers
Espoo Blues players
Sportspeople from Espoo